Thought for Food is the debut studio album by American musical duo The Books. It was released on June 3, 2002 by Tomlab. The album exhibits the duo's characteristic sampling from a variety of mundane and instrumental sources.

Critical reception

Pitchfork ranked Thought for Food as the fourth best album of 2002, and as the 125th best album of the 2000s. In 2015, Spin ranked Thought for Food at number 285 on its list of "The 300 Best Albums of the Past 30 Years".

Track listing

Personnel
Credits are adapted from the liner notes of the 2002 and 2011 issues of the album.

The Books
 Paul de Jong – music, mastering, mixing
 Nick Zammuto – music, mastering, mixing

Additional personnel
 Anne Doerner – fiddle and harmony vocals on "Getting the Done Job"
 Frieda Luczak – cover design
 Mikey Zammuto – bass on "Mikey Bass"

References

External links
 
 

2002 debut albums
The Books albums
Tomlab albums
Sound collage albums